Salem is a hamlet west of Chacewater, Cornwall, England.

References

Hamlets in Cornwall